Outland is the first collaborative album by Bill Laswell and Pete Namlook, released on February 2, 1994 by FAX +49-69/450464. The album consists of a single track lasting around 62 minutes in length.

Track listing

Personnel 
Adapted from the Outland liner notes.
Musicians
Bill Laswell – electronics
Pete Namlook – electronics, producer
Technical personnel
Oz Fritz – recording
Thi-Linh Le – cover art
Nicky Skopelitis – recording

Release history

References

External links 
 Outland at Bandcamp
 

1994 albums
Collaborative albums
Bill Laswell albums
Pete Namlook albums
FAX +49-69/450464 albums
Albums produced by Pete Namlook